Tomás Frías is a province in the northern parts of the Bolivian Potosí Department. Its capital is Potosí which is also the capital of the department. The province is named after the former president Tomás Frías Ametller.

Location
Tomás Frías province is one of sixteen provinces in the Potosí Department. It is located between 19° 00' und 19° 50' South and between 65° 32' und 66° 24' West. 

It borders Chayanta Province in the north, Oruro Department in the northwest, Antonio Quijarro Province in the southwest, José María Linares Province in the south, and Cornelio Saavedra Province in the east. 

The province extends over 115 km from east to west and from north to south.

Geography 
The Potosí mountain range traverses the province. Some of the highest mountains of the province are listed below:

Division
The province comprises four municipalities which are further subdivided into cantons.

Population
The main language of the province is Spanish, spoken by 84.5%, while 75.5% of the population speak Quechua. The population increased from 167,111 inhabitants (1992 census) to 176,922 (2001 census), an increase of 20%. Capital of the province is Potosí (132,966 inhabitants).  

28% of the population have no access to electricity, 50.5% have no sanitary facilities. 

21% of the population are employed in agriculture, 8% in mining, 10% in industry, 61% in general services. 92% of the population are Catholics, 5% Protestants.

The people are predominantly indigenous citizens of Quechua and Aymara descent.

See also 
 Ch'aki Mayu
 Jatun Mayu
 Tarapaya River

References

External links 
Population data (Spanish)

 

Provinces of Potosí Department